Hesar-e Sorkh (also Romanized as Ḩeşār-e Sorkh and Ḩeşār Sorkh) is a neighborhood of shandiz , Shandiz District, Torqabeh and Shandiz County, Razavi Khorasan Province, Iran. At the 2006 census, its population was 937, in 245 families.

References 

Populated places in Torqabeh and Shandiz County